Yevgeny Roshchin (born 28 May 1962) is a Belarusian ice hockey player. He competed in the men's tournament at the 1998 Winter Olympics.

Career statistics

Regular season and playoffs

International

References

External links
 

1962 births
Living people
Soviet ice hockey players
Olympic ice hockey players of Belarus
Ice hockey players at the 1998 Winter Olympics
Ice hockey people from Minsk
HC Dinamo Minsk players
Sokil Kyiv players
HK Neman Grodno players
MKS Cracovia (ice hockey) players
GKS Tychy (ice hockey) players
HKM Zvolen players
Soviet expatriate ice hockey players
Soviet expatriate sportspeople in Poland
Expatriate ice hockey players in Poland
Expatriate ice hockey players in Slovakia
Belarusian expatriate sportspeople in Slovakia
Belarusian expatriate sportspeople in Poland
Belarusian expatriate sportspeople in Spain
Expatriate ice hockey players in Spain
Belarusian expatriate ice hockey people